Faga'itua Bay is a large indentation in the eastern south coast of Tutuila in American Samoa. Many of the island's villages are located on the shore of the bay, the largest of which is Faga'itua. Other villages are Auto, Amaua, Utusia, Pagai, and Alofau.

References

Bays of Oceania
Landforms of American Samoa
Tutuila